Poecilotheria rufilata, also known as the red slate ornamental, reddish parachute spider, Travancore slate-red, or rufus parachute spider, is an arboreal tarantula. It is endemic to South Western Ghats of India. It is classed as "endangered", threatened by habitat loss and smuggling for the pet trade.

Description
The female is larger than the male, with a body length of about 8 cm, the male being at most 3.5 cm in body length. In measured wild-caught specimens, the longest leg of the female was up to 8 cm in total length, that of the male up to 7 cm.

In the first and fourth pairs of legs, the ground color is yellow. The femur is also yellow proximally, ending with a black part and a thin yellow band. The tibia is yellow.

Ecology
The species is confined to the south Western Ghats of India, where it lives in tree hollows, under tree bark, and in rock crevices. It sometimes enters human settlements. It is classed as "endangered", with the major threats being habitat degradation and collection for the pet trade. It is smuggled out of India for sale in Europe and America.

As a pet
Compared to other tiger spiders, this species is Very skittish and flighty. This species will not hesitate to bite. Spiderlings are extremely fast as they grow they get quite strong. Adults are also extremely fast. This is not a beginner species.

References

External links
Photos

rufilata
Spiders of the Indian subcontinent
Endemic fauna of India
Spiders described in 1899